Öskən (also, Öksən, Osgyan, and Oskyan) is a village in the Tovuz Rayon of Azerbaijan.  The village forms part of the municipality of Qəribli.

References 

Populated places in Tovuz District